Sarah Margon is an American political advisor who is the nominee to serve as Assistant Secretary of State for Democracy, Human Rights, and Labor in the Biden administration.

Education 
Margon earned a Bachelor of Arts degree in American studies from Wesleyan University and a Master of Science in foreign service from Georgetown University.

Career 
Margon began her career as a humanitarian and conflict policy advisor for Oxfam. She later worked as a staffer on the United States Senate Foreign Relations Subcommittee on Africa and Global Health Policy and as a foreign policy advisor to Senator Russ Feingold. She later worked as  the associate director for sustainable security and peace-building at the Center for American Progress and deputy Washington director of Human Rights Watch. Margon has most recently worked as a U.S. foreign policy advisor for the Open Society Foundations.

Personal life 
Margon and her husband, Sam Chaltain, married in 2004. They have two sons.

References 

Living people
Wesleyan University alumni
Walsh School of Foreign Service alumni
Oxfam people
Center for American Progress people
Human Rights Watch people
Biden administration personnel
Year of birth missing (living people)